Andrzej Kochanowski (1542–1596) was Polish nobleman, poet and translator. He was Jan Kochanowski's younger brother and Piotr Kochanowski's paternal uncle. He married Zofia Sobieska and became father of (among others) Jan and Samuel. 

Jan Zamoyski, the great chancellor of the Kingdom of Poland, was Andrzej Kochanowski's patron and suggested that he translate Virgil's Aeneid. Kochanowski's version of Virgil's epic poem, published in 1590, is among the most important Polish translations of the 16th century. Kochanowski also translated works by Plutarch.

References 

Polish poets
Polish translators
1542 births
1596 deaths
Translators of Virgil